Maja Krantz (born 27 March 1987) is a Swedish football defender. She previously played in the Damallsvenskan for Linköpings FC, with whom she has also played the UEFA Women's Champions League. As a junior international she played the 2006 U-19 European Championship.

Aged 17, Krantz had joined Stattena from Högaborgs BK for the 2004 season. She signed for Linköpings ahead of the 2007 campaign.

In January 2016 Krantz transferred to Notts County of the English FA WSL.

References

External links
 
 
 

1987 births
Living people
Swedish women's footballers
Swedish expatriate women's footballers
Damallsvenskan players
Linköpings FC players
Sportspeople from Helsingborg
Högaborgs BK players
Notts County L.F.C. players
Women's Super League players
Expatriate women's footballers in England
Swedish expatriate sportspeople in England
Women's association football defenders